The Wonder of It All is a 2007 documentary film directed by Jeffrey Roth and distributed by Quiver Distribution.

The film is composed of first-person interviews with seven of the 12 Apollo astronauts who walked on the Moon (Buzz Aldrin, Alan Bean, Edgar Mitchell, John Young, Charlie Duke, Eugene Cernan, and Harrison Schmitt).  The astronauts explain their backgrounds, their Moon missions, and how walking on the Moon changed their lives.

References

External links
 
 

2007 films
American documentary films
Films about astronauts
Films about the Apollo program
Documentary films about the space program of the United States
2000s English-language films
2000s American films